The Swedish Aerosport Mosquito is a Swedish powered hang glider designed and produced by Swedish Aerosport and introduced in 1995.

Design and development
The Mosquito was the power package that started renewed interest in the powered self-launching hang glider concept when it was introduced in 1995. The power package can be mated with any hang glider wing. Ready to fly the aircraft features a cable-braced hang glider-style high-wing, weight-shift controls, single-place accommodation, foot-launching and landing and a single engine in pusher configuration.

The aircraft uses a standard hang glider wing, made from bolted-together aluminum tubing, with its wing covered in Dacron sailcloth. The wing is supported by a single tube-type kingpost and uses an "A" frame control bar. The engine is a lightweight, two-stroke, single cylinder Radne Raket 120 of  that produces power though a 3.5:1 belt reduction drive, with an extension shaft. Folding legs protect the propeller during ground operations. The engine package can be installed in most hang glider pod harnesses. The Mosquito can also be purchased as a complete harness assembly.

The original Mosquito design was updated in 2001 as the Mosquito NRG, which remains in production. The NRG incorporates a flat back plate, front opening, propeller brake, integrated controls and electric starting.

Wings that are approved for the Mosquito include the A-I-R Atos rigid wing and the Aeros Discus M.

Specifications (Mosquito)

Image gallery

References

External links

1990s Swedish ultralight aircraft
Single-engined pusher aircraft
Powered hang gliders